Edward G. Holley (November 26, 1927 – February 18, 2010) was an American librarian and educator. Holley graduated from David Lipscomb College in Nashville, Tennessee in 1949 with a bachelor's degree in English. In 1951 he graduated from George Peabody College for Teachers in Nashville, Tennessee with a master's in library science. Holley went on to receive his Ph.D. in library science at the University of Illinois at Urbana-Champaign in 1961.

Holley began his professional career at the University of Houston and worked there for nine years. In 1972 he moved to Chapel Hill, North Carolina, where he accepted the position of dean and professor in the School of Information and Library Science. He remained dean until 1985, and was a professor from 1989 to 1995, when he retired. 

Additionally, he was president of the American Library Association (ALA) from 1974–75.  He was honored with the Association's Melvil Dewey Medal in 1983 and the Lippincott Award in 1987.

References

 

1927 births
2010 deaths
American librarians
Lipscomb University alumni
Peabody College alumni
People from Pulaski, Tennessee
People from Durham, North Carolina
University of Houston people
University of Illinois School of Information Sciences alumni
University of North Carolina at Chapel Hill faculty